Breweries in Kansas produce a wide range of beers in different styles that are marketed locally and regionally. Brewing companies vary widely in the volume and variety of beer produced, from small nanobreweries to microbreweries to massive multinational conglomerate macrobreweries.

In 2012, Kansas's 21 breweries and brewpubs employed 70 people directly, and more than 10,000 others in related jobs such as wholesaling and retailing. Including people directly employed in brewing, as well as those who supply Kansas' breweries with everything from ingredients to machinery, the total business and personal tax revenue generated by Kansas' breweries and related industries was more than $190 million. Consumer purchases of Kansas' brewery products generated more than $90 million in additional tax revenue. By 2019, according to the Brewers Association, Kansas ranked 32nd in the number of craft breweries per capita with 59 and 34th in the United States for overall number of breweries statewide.

For context, at the end of 2013 there were 2,822 breweries in the United States, including 2,768 craft breweries subdivided into 1,237 brewpubs, 1,412 microbreweries and 119 regional craft breweries. In that same year, according to the Beer Institute, the brewing industry employed around 43,000 Americans in brewing and distribution and had a combined economic impact of more than $246 billion.

Open breweries
The following is a list of breweries and microbreweries.  The largest brewery in Kansas is Free State Brewing Company in Lawrence

 BJ's Restaurant & Brewery (Huntington Beach, California-based) has one location in Wichita.
 Gordon Biersch Brewing Company (Palo Alto, California-based) has one location in Leawood.
 Granite City Food and Brewery (St. Cloud, Minnesota-based) has two locations in Kansas City and Olathe.

Former breweries
The following is a list of breweries and microbreweries that have closed or have ceased brewing; this list is for tracking former locations.

See also 
 Beer in the United States
 List of breweries in the United States
 List of microbreweries
 List of wineries in Kansas

References

Citations

Works Cited
 

Kansas
Breweries